The following is a list of episodes for Birdy the Mighty: Decode episodes, which aired on various Japanese television stations on 4 July 2008. The show was licensed to North America by FUNIMATION, scheduled for release in 2010.

Birdy the Mighty: Decode was first announced under the name Birdy the Movement. It was then revealed in the Tokyo International Anime Fair that the show would be aired in the summer as Birdy the Mighty: Decode. A trailer for Birdy the Mighty Decode was announced on its official website.

Episodes

Birdy the Mighty: Decode

Birdy the Mighty: Decode starts when Birdy secretly entered Earth to track down an alien criminal named Geega as an Earth Federation police officer. In the midst of her work, she accidentally kills a Japanese national named Senkawa Tsutomu. To save his life, Birdy merges her body with his.

As the two work together on maintaining their lives, a mysterious person wishes to uses the Ryunka in order to commit genocide on the entire Earth.

This season uses two musical themes: one opening and one ending. The opening theme is "Sora" by Hearts Grow, while the ending theme is "Let's Go Together" by Afromania

Birdy the Mighty: Decode 02

Season 2 starts a few months after Shyamalan was killed while attempting to use Ryunka to kill everyone on Earth starting in Japan, Senkawa and Birdy are still attempting to maintain their dual lives until space criminals connected to the Ryunka case escape from Federation police custody.

The opening theme for this season is  "kiseki" by NIRGILIS, while the ending theme is "Tane" by no3b.

Also see

 Birdy the Mighty

References
General
 
 

Specific

Lists of anime episodes